A draisine is a light auxiliary rail vehicle, driven by service personnel, equipped to transport crew and material necessary for the maintenance of  railway infrastructure.

The eponymous term is derived from the German inventor Baron Karl Drais, who invented his Laufmaschine (German for "running machine") in 1817, which was called Draisine in German (vélocipède or draisienne in French) by the press. It is the first reliable claim for a practically used precursor to the bicycle, basically the first commercially successful two-wheeled, steerable, human-propelled machine, nicknamed hobby-horse or dandy horse.

Later, the name draisine came to be applied only to the invention used on rails and was extended to similar vehicles, even when not human-powered. Because of their low weight and small size, they can be put on and taken off the rails at any place, allowing trains to pass.

In the United States, motor-powered draisines are known as speeders while human-powered ones are referred as handcars.  Vehicles that can be driven on both the highway and the rail line are called road–rail vehicles, or (after a trademark) Hy-Rails.

Dressin, velorail, trolley, or railbike 

"Draisines", called dressin in Swedish, dresin in Norwegian, dræsine in Danish, and resiina in Finnish, refers to pedal-powered rail-cycles which were used by railroad maintenance workers in Finland, Sweden, and Norway until about 1950, as handcars were elsewhere.

Draisines nowadays are used for recreation on several unused railway lines in Germany, Sweden, Norway, Poland, some other European countries and South Korea. Several companies rent draisines in Sweden. In the United States, railbike tours have operated in several states nationwide: California, Maine, Oregon, the Adirondack Mountains of upstate New York, and Delaware.

Until 2007, Finland hosted an annual competition, Resiina-ralli (Draisine Rally), involving several draisine teams travelling for many days on the railways from one corner of the country to another.

Types

Automotive draisines

Military use 

The military use of draisines concerned, first of all, armoured draisines. They were light armoured rail motor vehicles, intended for reconnaissance, scouting, track patrolling, and other auxiliary combat tasks, usually belonging to armoured trains. Early vehicles of this kind were built in Russia during World War I. Later, often armoured cars were used as armoured draisines, after exchanging their wheels to railroad ones, or fitting them with additional retractable railroad rollers. Some countries, however, manufactured purpose-built armoured draisines between the wars, such as the USSR and Czechoslovakia. Peculiar vehicles were Polish armoured draisines - they were tanks or tankettes fitted with special rail chassis, able to be used on rails or on the ground, leaving the rail chassis on the rails. Some countries developed railtrack armoured draisines, with retractable tracks railroad wheels; they were not widely used, however. Different armoured draisines were used during the Second World War, starting from the invasion of Poland by Nazi Germany.

Prior to World War II, the Japanese Empire had already made extensive use of draisines such as the Sumida M.2593 in the Japanese invasion of Manchuria and the Sino-Japanese War. From 1952, the Wikham Armoured Trolley was used by British security forces during the Malayan Emergency.

Construction 
People have been putting bicycles on railroad tracks ever since there have been both bicycles and railroads. From time to time, factory-built models have been available, beginning with a device marketed in 1908 through the Sears catalogue for just US$5.45.

There are many designs of draisine. However, certain fundamentals of railbike design must be adhered to, foremost among them the reconciliation of a bicycle's stability with adaptation to riding on a railway track: bicycles are kept upright by the rider steering in the direction of an impending fall, but this ability is sacrificed when the bicycle is constrained by rails. Simply adding flanged wheels to a conventional bicycle would make it impossible to balance, so the typical approach to stabilization is to add an outrigger, with roller(s), across to the second rail from near the bicycle’s rear wheel. Even such an outrigger system is not without its complications, as tracks that are no longer perfectly parallel — common on sections of abandoned track — can result in derailment. Additional guide rollers can help alleviate this problem at the expense of greater weight.

See also

 Balance bicycle
 Handcar
 History of the bicycle
 Human-powered land vehicle
 Norry, improvised draisines used in Cambodia
 In the film Frog Dreaming (1986), the young protagonist builds and uses a railbike.
 Railbus
 Railroad speeder
 Railway Mokes
 Taiwanese push car railways

References

External links

 Railriders   Video produced by Oregon Field Guide